Hepatocyte growth factor (HGF) or scatter factor (SF) is a paracrine cellular growth, motility and morphogenic factor. It is secreted by mesenchymal cells and targets and acts primarily upon epithelial cells and endothelial cells, but also acts on haemopoietic progenitor cells and T cells. It has been shown to have a major role in embryonic organ development, specifically in myogenesis, in adult organ regeneration, and in wound healing.

Function 
Hepatocyte growth factor regulates cell growth, cell motility, and morphogenesis by activating a tyrosine kinase signaling cascade after binding to the proto-oncogenic c-Met receptor. Hepatocyte growth factor is secreted by mesenchymal cells and acts as a multi-functional cytokine on cells of mainly epithelial origin. Its ability to stimulate mitogenesis, cell motility, and matrix invasion gives it a central role in angiogenesis, tumorogenesis, and tissue regeneration.

Structure 
It is secreted as a single inactive polypeptide and is cleaved by serine proteases into a 69-kDa alpha-chain and 34-kDa beta-chain. A disulfide bond between the alpha and beta chains produces the active, heterodimeric molecule. The protein belongs to the plasminogen subfamily of S1 peptidases but has no detectable protease activity.

Clinical significance 
Human HGF plasmid DNA therapy of cardiomyocytes is being examined as a potential treatment for coronary artery disease as well as treatment for the damage that occurs to the heart after myocardial infarction.
As well as the well-characterised effects of HGF on epithelial cells, endothelial cells and haemopoietic progenitor cells, HGF also regulates the chemotaxis of T cells into heart tissue. Binding of HGF by c-Met, expressed on T cells, causes the upregulation of c-Met, CXCR3, and CCR4 which in turn imbues them with the ability to migrate into heart tissue. HGF also promotes angiogenesis in ischemia injury. 
HGF may further play a role as an indicator for prognosis of chronicity for Chikungunya virus induced arthralgia. High HGF levels correlate with high rates of recovery.

Excessive local expression of HGF in the breasts has been implicated in macromastia. HGF is also importantly involved in normal mammary gland development.

HGF has been implicated in a variety of cancers, including of the lungs, pancreas, thyroid, colon, and breast.

Increased expression of HGF has been associated with the enhanced and scarless wound healing capabilities of fibroblast cells isolated from the oral mucosa tissue.

Circulating plasma levels 
Plasma from patients with advanced heart failure presents increased levels of HGF, which correlates with a negative prognosis and a high risk of mortality. Circulating HGF has been also identified as a prognostic marker of severity in patients with hypertension. Circulating HGF has been also suggested as a precocious biomarker for the acute phase of bowel inflammation.

Pharmacokinetics 
Exogenous HGF administered by intravenous injection is cleared rapidly from circulation by the liver, with a half-life of approximately 4 minutes.

Modulators
Dihexa is an orally active, centrally penetrant small-molecule compound that directly binds to HGF and potentiates its ability to activate its receptor, c-Met. It is a strong inducer of neurogenesis and is being studied for the potential treatment of Alzheimer's disease and Parkinson's disease.

Interactions 
Hepatocyte growth factor has been shown to interact with the protein product of the c-Met oncogene, identified as the HGF receptor (HGFR). Both overexpression of the Met/HGFR receptor protein and autocrine activation of Met/HGFR by simultaneous expression of the hepatocyte growth factor ligand have been implicated in oncogenesis.
Hepatocyte growth factor interacts with the sulfated glycosaminoglycans heparan sulfate and dermatan sulfate. The interaction with heparan sulfate allows hepatocyte growth factor to form a complex with c-Met that is able to transduce intracellular signals leading to cell division and cell migration.

See also 
 Epidermal growth factor
 Insulin-like growth factor 1
 Epithelial–mesenchymal transition
 Madin-Darby Canine Kidney Cells

References

Further reading

External links 
 
 Hepatocyte growth factor on the Atlas of Genetics and Oncology
 UCSD Signaling Gateway Molecule Page on HGF
 

Growth factors
Developmental genes and proteins
Cytokines
World Anti-Doping Agency prohibited substances